Laverne Mitchell Lewycky (12 February 1946 – 3 August 2020) was a Canadian politician and New Democratic Party member of the House of Commons of Canada.  He was a professor of sociology and communication studies, who also served as an executive assistant and consultant to governments and other organizations by career.
 
He represented Manitoba's Dauphin electoral district for one term in the 32nd Canadian Parliament. Following two attempts at the riding in 1974 and 1979, he succeeded in the 1980 federal election. His political portfolio was multiculturalism. Lewycky served on Constitution Committee, Special Parliamentary Committee on Participation of Visible Minorities in Canadian Society, and standing committees on management and members' services, privileges and elections, agriculture, miscellaneous estimates as well as the Special Joint Committee on Official Languages. His private member's bill changed the name of the riding from Dauphin to Dauphin-Swan River. Lewycky left national politics to do doctoral studies after the 1984 election.

Professionally, as an educator, Lewycky was a university and college professor who taught in Manitoba, Ontario, Quebec and New Brunswick. As a consultant, he worked as an internal communications advisor and an advanced communications officer with various federal government departments such as Health Canada and Canada Revenue Agency. As a public speaker, he has been a Dale Carnegie Public Speaking Courses instructor in Winnipeg and Montreal. Additionally, he has served as a distinguished toastmaster (DTM) in Manitoba, New Brunswick and Ontario. Currently he works out of Dauphin, Manitoba.

Educationally, he graduated from the Dauphin Collegiate & Technical Institute (DCTI). He then graduated from the University of Manitoba with his B.A. (Hons.) and M.A. degrees. He has done doctoral studies at McGill University, Carleton University and Providence Seminary. He has published various chapters in books and peer-reviewed journals, especially in the area of multiculturalism. He was a Parliamentary Committee Member that authored the milestone report, Equality Now! He also served as a consultant for the Standing Committee on Multiculturalism that produced Multiculturalism: Building the Canadian Mosaic.

As an ordained minister, Lewycky has served congregations in Manitoba, Ontario, Quebec and New Brunswick. Inter-denominationally, he has also provided pulpit supply, and been an officiant for baptisms, marriages and funerals. He has served on numerous proclamations and prayer breakfast committees and as a guest speaker.

His leadership as a multicultural Ukrainian-Canadian has been pictured and cited in The Ukrainian Canadians: a History by Michael H. Marunchak. Lewycky died on 3 August 2020.

Electoral record

Dauphin—Swan River—Neepawa

Dauphin—Swan River

Dauphin

References

1946 births
Living people
Members of the House of Commons of Canada from Manitoba
New Democratic Party MPs
People from Dauphin, Manitoba